Karin Brownlee (July 25, 1955) was the Kansas Secretary of Labor between 2011 and 2012, serving in the administration of Governor Sam Brownback. She was later, by her own report, fired by Brownback based on a disagreement about how the agency was running. A member of the Republican Party, she previously served as a member of the Kansas Senate, representing the 23rd district between 1997 and 2011.

Kansas Senate

Committee assignments
 Commerce (Chair)
 Financial Institutions and Insurance (Vice Chair)
 Joint Committee on Administrative Rules and Regulations
 Assessment and Taxation
 Confirmation Oversight
 Joint Committee on Corrections and Juvenile Justice Oversight
 Transportation
 Utilities

Kansas Department of Labor
In early January 2011 Brownlee took office as Secretary in the Kansas Department of Labor (KDOL). She claimed that the upgrading of the unemployment claims technology project commenced in 2005 was being mismanagement and brought in an outside technology company to review work to date.

In August 2011 Brownlee terminated the employment of  asthma sufferer Kathleen Arbogast who filed suit  against KDOL in January 2013 claiming discrimination and retaliation and seeking $100.000 in damages. Arbogast had complained about staff wearing perfume and other fragrances interfered with her ability to perform her duties.  She was moved to the basement to remove her from such contact but claimed that the fragrances worn by other workers visiting her continued her asthma problems.  KDOL sought to have the lawsuit dismissed but the U.S. District Court for the District of Kansas  denied the motion,  KDOL then appealed to the 10th circuit court which affirmed the decision in the District Court.  The case moved to the U.S. District Court for the District of Kansas which brought down its decision 9 September 2016. In the discussion it found that, " ... Plaintiff has pointed the Court to no statutory authority indicating that KDOL has the capacity to be sued. Accordingly, the Court grants Defendant’s motion to dismiss."

In September 2012 Brownlee was removed from KDOL by Gov. Sam Brownback without explanation.

References

External links
Senator Karin Brownlee official Kansas Senate website
 Karin Brownlee official campaign website
 
 Follow the Money - Karin Brownlee
 1996, 1998, 2000, 2002, 2004, 2006, 2008 campaign contributions

State cabinet secretaries of Kansas
Republican Party Kansas state senators
Living people
Women state legislators in Kansas
1955 births
Kansas State University alumni
20th-century American women politicians
20th-century American politicians
21st-century American women politicians
21st-century American politicians